Babman (a spoof of Batman) is an adventure story arc of the Philippine comic strip series Pugad Baboy, created by Pol Medina Jr. and originally published in the Philippine Daily Inquirer. This particular story arc lasts 37 strips long. In 2002, the story arc was reprinted in Katorse, the fourteenth book compilation of the comic strip series.

Synopsis
Babman, the "Pork Knight", is Bab's secret identity. He is otherwise known as Bruce Swine (a spoof of Bruce Wayne) to residents of Gothom City (a spoof of Gotham City and a twist on the Filipino word, gutom, meaning "hunger" - as Gothom City is a squatters' area.) where as Babman, he patrols at night looking for situations with potential for violence and criminal activity.

In Sapang Talahib (Grass Creek), a different squatters' area, Bab meet Mr. Chan, owner of the "Shaolin Temple", a restaurateur who hired him as a waiter. Mr. Chan becomes Bab's friend and master in the Kung Fu style known as the "Stoned Dragon", a martial arts technique practiced with the aid of a healthy dose of marijuana. Mr. Chan declares Bab a "Stoned Master" and has him receive the Master's mark - a Dragon and Tiger tattoo made by placing cast iron hot plates on both forearms. Bab's mother, however, discovers his "Stoned Master" status and has him rehabilitated for four months. Upon his release, he returns to Sapang Talahib, and discovers that the area had been converted into a parking lot for a nearby mall. He follows the former residents to Cavite, where they had been resettled in a place they called Gothom City, as Sapang Talahib mysteriously suffered fire, allegedly done by corrupt police officers to forcefully abandon the area, while reasoning behind the fire as "Faulty Electrical Wiring", a common cause of fire among squatter's area.

"Samting fishy"
A few months pass before the Gothom City residents are harassed by goons hired by the lot's owner. Babman decides to defend the residents from these goons, using the street fighting techniques he had learned from Mr. Chan. Some time later, Bab learns that the residents were being moved again, this time by hiring professional squatters and goons to harass the residents, despite their earlier vehement opposition to being relocated. This arouses his suspicions that something fishy was going on, while fresh and dried fish vendors walks by.

His investigation reveal that a certain Doña Fe Bagamundo had bought the Gothom City lot. He also discovered that the same Doña Fe had bought all the lots formerly occupied by the Gothom City residents. Babman stakes out the residents at the new relocation site they called Malunggay Uno (Moringa One). Goons again harass the squatters, but instead of confronting them, Babman begins tailing the bad guys. As he suspected, the goons make their way to Doña Fe's mansion. Eavesdropping on the group, Babman learns their modus operandi: Doña Fe's goons pretend to be the lot owner's bad guys; they would encourage violence until public sympathy fell in favor of the squatters and the lot owner was forced to sell the land. Babman learns the awful truth - the people he had been defending are professional squatters. He tries to determine who the legitimate squatters were and also interviews the lots' former owners, before getting into a showdown with Doña Fe and her goons.

Unmasking the mastermind
Babman captures the goons and gathers the residents in a meeting to explain the whole plot. He prevails on the residents to cooperate when he brings the case to the Solicitor-General, in order for the lots to be returned to their rightful owners. He, however, decides not to reveal the identities of the professional squatters just yet. He is about to take Rufo, Doña Fe's head goon and the other bad guys to the DILG when he sees something on Rufo's arms. He asks the residents to give him two hours - there is someone missing from his list of bad guys.

Babman returns to the "Shaolin Temple" he encounters the crooked cops who were part of Doña Fe's racket. He takes away their guns and goes looking for Mr. Chan. Babman reveals his identity to Mr. Chan, who asks how Babman was able to uncover his collusion with Doña Fe. Babman explains that he saw the tiger and dragon tattoo on Rufo's arms. He also details that a check of Mr Chan's files at the Bureau of Immigration and Deportation reveal that he is an illegal alien named Chian Jie Yao who just used Doña Fe to buy the land for him, since Philippine laws prohibit foreign land ownership. Bab attempts to arrest Mr. Chan, who blows cannabis smoke at his face and executes the "Stoned Dragon" technique. Fortunately, Bab had learned a countermeasure; the "Curly Joe Defense". As Mr. Chan and Bab square off, the crooked cops barge in with their back-up revolvers. Using the fighting technique he had learned from watching Robert Jaworski, "Basketball Kung Fu", Bab subdues all three bad guys.

Mr. Chan and Doña Fe are turned over to the NBI after they were charged with conspiracy, grave threats and arson. The squatters move out of the land while the case is heard.

At the end of the story, Polgas stresses that this battle is only one in series of battles and said Mr. Chan and Doña Fe are not the only masterminds of the scheme. As he unrolls a scroll near him, Mr. Chan is in the middle, Doña Fe in lower rank, there are more higher-ups in the chain, including the Department of Agrarian Reform (for giving Filipinos false hopes), National Housing Authority (for giving titles to foreigners, at the cost of Filipinos), Philippine National Police and AFP officers (acting as foreigners' bodyguards, often sowing discord on their fellow countrymen the supposed to protect), Bureau of Immigration (for giving foreigners citizenship for owning lands owned by Filipinos), Congressmen and Senators (for taking kickbacks on foreigner's bribes for themselves, again at the cost of Filipinos), even Presidents (for turning a blind eye on their people). He explained it all in a sarcastic manner, sarcastic voice and sarcastic facial expressions.

Continuity
 Babman is the Pork Knight's first appearance as a featured main character; he made his first official appearance, however, in the 1993 story arc The Olongapo Caper, where he also drove the Fatmobile.

Cultural references 
 The "Fatmobile", a spoof of the Batmobile), is a borrowed Volkswagen Beetle with bat-like tailfins and a peace symbol on the hood. Its horn makes an "Oink!Oink!" sound, similar to that of a pig.
 Doña Fe gives her complete name as Felicidad Bagamundo y Maldecaralubio viuda de Cancarrote.
 Bruce Swine is known as a baryannaire philanthropist among the squatters. Baryannaire is a portmanteau of barya, a Filipino word meaning "small change", and "billionaire".
 Bruce relieves himself of the pain from carrying plates of sisig in his forearms by cooling them in an ice cream freezer labeled "Magnolecta Ice Cream". Magnolecta is a portmanteau of rival ice cream companies Magnolia (now owned by the San Miguel Corporation) and Selecta.
 Politicians Francisco Tatad and Juan Ponce Enrile, plus former Supreme Court Chief Justice Hilario Davide Jr. make cameo appearances. In an oblique reference to the 2000 impeachment proceedings against then-President Joseph Estrada, Tatad tells a poor laborer that his second pay envelope is "immaterial and irrelevant"; Enrile adds, "I second the motion". In Davide's courtroom, a squatter also admonishes his lawyer to seek a "writ of victor corpus" (writ of habeas corpus) or a "subpoena duces rectum" (subpoena duces tecum). Davide's "sh" pronunciation of words that have "s" sounds is also present.
 Babman's primary weapon is, ironically, his utility belt with the peace symbol buckle. He also uses it as a bottle opener and as an ear-cleaning tool.
 The names of the two crooked cops in cahoots with Mr. Chan, Jing and Jude, are an oblique reference to the sons of former Philippine President Joseph Estrada - Jinggoy Estrada and Jude Estrada. Half of one strip, in particular, shows Polgas' long diatribe against the elder Estrada (without mentioning him by name).  
 The tiger tattoo on Rufo's arm that led Babman to Mr. Chan is actually that of Hobbes, the tiger character from Calvin and Hobbes.
Mr. Chan spoofs David Carradine's Shaolin master in the TV series Kung Fu. This is shown by his restaurant's name, "Shaolin Temple", and Bab is called "Grass-smoker", just as Carradine's character Kwai Chang Caine was nicknamed "Grasshopper".
The back cover of Katorse, in which Babman appears, is a spoof of a cover of Frank Miller's 1986 comic book miniseries The Dark Knight Returns.
 Polgas broke the wall in the last part, revealing that the corruption of land grabbing runs deep, not only from the old woman and Mr. Chan, but several Government officials was named part of the corruption.

Pugad Baboy